The Dukedom of Albemarle has been created twice in the Peerage of England, each time ending in extinction. Additionally, the title was created a third time by James II in exile and a fourth time by his son the Old Pretender, in the Jacobite Peerage. It arose in connection with the ancient Norman Counts of Aumale of Aumale in Normandy. See also Earl of Albemarle.

Dukes of Albemarle (Aumale), first creation (1397)
Edward of Norwich, Duke of Aumale (Albemarle) (1373–1415), grandson of Edward III, was deprived of this dukedom in 1399. He later succeeded his father as Duke of York.

Dukes of Albemarle, second creation (1660)

also Earl of Torrington, Baron Monck of Potheridge, Beauchamp and Teyes (England, 7 July 1660)
George Monck, 1st Duke of Albemarle (1608–1670) was rewarded with his peerages for his part in the Restoration.
Christopher Monck, 2nd Duke of Albemarle (1653–1688), only son of the 1st Duke, died childless.

Dukes of Albemarle, first Jacobite creation (1696)
also "Earl of Rochford" and "Baron Romney" (Jacobite, 1696)
 Henry FitzJames, "1st Duke of Albemarle" (1673–1702), illegitimate son of James II was created a peer by his father in exile

Dukes of Albemarle, second Jacobite creation (1722)

also "Marquess Monck and Fitzhemon", "Earl of Bath", "Viscount Bevil" (Jacobite, 1722), Baron Lansdowne (Great Britain, 1712) and "Baron Lansdown of Bideford" (Jacobite, 1722)
 George Granville, 1st Baron Lansdowne, "1st Duke of Albemarle" (1666–1735), a notable Tory, was made a Jacobite peer by The Old Pretender, which creation was not recognised within the Kingdom of Great Britain.
 Bernard Granville, "2nd Duke of Albemarle" (1700 – 2 July 1776), nephew of Lord Lansdowne, allegedly succeeded his uncle in said Jacobite peerage. Never married.

Notes

References

Extinct dukedoms in the Peerage of England
Extinct dukedoms in the Jacobite Peerage
Noble titles created in 1397
Noble titles created in 1660
Noble titles created in 1696
Noble titles created in 1722